Jamaica–Mexico relations are the diplomatic relations between Jamaica and Mexico. Both nations are members of the Association of Caribbean States, Community of Latin American and Caribbean States, Organization of American States and the United Nations.

History 
Jamaica and Mexico are two American nations with a common history. Both nations had been under control of the Spanish Empire and Jamaica was governed from the Viceroyal of New Spain based in Mexico City. In May 1655, Jamaica became under British rule until its independence in August 1962. Diplomatic relations between Jamaica and Mexico were established on 18 March 1966. At the time, Mexico saw Jamaica as a leader of English speaking Caribbean nations.

Since the establishment of diplomatic relations, both nations have worked together in numerous international forums such as the Association of Caribbean States, Community of Latin American and Caribbean States and the Organization of American States (OAS) where in 1970s, both Jamaica and Mexico were the only nations to actively protest against the exclusion of Cuba from the OAS and called for the normalization of relations with the Cuban government. In 1974, Mexican President Luis Echeverría paid an official visit to Jamaica. In 1975, Jamaican Prime Minister Michael Manley paid a visit to Mexico. Since then, there have been several high-level visits between leaders of both nations. In March 2016, both nations celebrated 50 years of diplomatic relations.

High-level visits
High-level visits from Jamaica to Mexico

 Prime Minister Michael Manley (1975, 1980, 1989)
 Prime Minister P. J. Patterson (1993, 2004)
 Prime Minister Portia Simpson-Miller (2014)

High-level visits from Mexico to Jamaica

 President Luis Echeverría (1974)
 President Miguel de la Madrid Hurtado (1987)
 President Carlos Salinas de Gortari (1990)
 President Vicente Fox (2005)

Bilateral relations
Both nations have signed several bilateral agreements such as an Agreement on the Suppression of Visa Requirements for Ordinary Passport Holders (1968); Agreement on Trade (1975); Agreement on Tourism Cooperation (1990); Agreement on Cultural Cooperation (1990); Agreement of Cooperation to Combat Drug Trafficking and Drug Dependency (1990); Agreement on Scientific and Technical Cooperation (1996); Agreement on the Suppression of Visa Requirements for Diplomatic and Official Passport Holders (2007) and an Agreement of Air Transportation (2009).

Trade
In 2017, total trade between Jamaica and Mexico amounted to US$178 million. In 2015, Mexican companies invested over US$200 million in Jamaica, mostly in the tourism and airports industry. In 2016, the Mexican government provided Jamaica with a US$1.8 million grant for a Riverton Road rehabilitation project. Mexican multinational companies such as Cemex and Grupo Aeroportuario del Pacífico operate in Jamaica.

Resident diplomatic missions

 Jamaica has an embassy in Mexico City.
 Mexico has an embassy in Kingston.

See also
 Metro Jamaica

References

 
Mexico
Jamaica